Paul Justin Vogel (born October 14, 1993) is a former American football punter. He signed with the Green Bay Packers as an undrafted free agent in 2017. He played college football at the University of Miami.

Professional career

Green Bay Packers
After going undrafted in the 2017 NFL Draft, Vogel signed with the Green Bay Packers on May 5, 2017. He received interest from multiple teams, ultimately he chose the Packers because he felt he'd have an "equal chance and equal opportunity to compete." Vogel was expected to compete with veteran Jake Schum for the starting punting job. However, Schum was unable to participate due to injury, leading to his release on June 1, 2017. Vogel averaged 45.7 yards per punt with a long of 60 in the preseason, earning him a spot on the Packers' 53-man roster. He played in all 16 regular season games, recording 71 punts for 3,155 yards for an average of 44.4 yards. He also set the single-season franchise record for net punting average with 41.6 yards per punt and was selected to be a 2018 Pro Bowl alternate.

On May 4, 2018, Vogel was released by the Packers after the team drafted punter J. K. Scott.

Cleveland Browns
On May 7, 2018, Vogel was claimed off waivers by the Cleveland Browns. He was waived on September 1, 2018.

San Francisco 49ers
On March 19, 2019, Vogel signed a one-year contract with the San Francisco 49ers. He was waived on April 29, 2019.

Denver Broncos
On July 23, 2019, Vogel was signed by the Denver Broncos, but was waived four days later.

New York Guardians
Vogel was selected by the New York Guardians in the 2020 XFL Supplemental Draft on November 22, 2019. He had his contract terminated when the league suspended operations on April 10, 2020.

Career statistics

References

External links
Florida Gators bio
Miami Hurricanes bio
Green Bay Packers bio

1993 births
Living people
Players of American football from Tampa, Florida
American football punters
Florida Gators football players
Miami Hurricanes football players
Green Bay Packers players
Cleveland Browns players
San Francisco 49ers players
Denver Broncos players
New York Guardians players